Alexander, Prince of Schaumburg-Lippe (Ernst August Alexander Christian Viktor Hubert; born 25 December 1958) is the head of the House of Schaumburg-Lippe, which ruled the sovereign principality of the same name within the German Empire until 1918.

Biography
He was born in Düsseldorf, the second son of Philipp-Ernst, Prince of Schaumburg-Lippe (1928-2003) and his wife Baroness Eva-Benita von Tiele-Winckler (1927-2013). At the time of the death of his grandfather, Prince  Wolrad in 1962, Alexander was unlikely to succeed to the headship of the princely house. However following the death of his older brother Hereditary Prince Georg-Wilhelm in a motorcycle accident on 31 July 1983, Alexander became the heir apparent and new Hereditary Prince. He succeeded as head of the princely house following his father's death on 28 August 2003. 

He studied law at Göttingen and moved into Bückeburg Palace upon his succession, managing the properties of the House. He is also known as a devoted jazz pianist, and has occasionally given concerts together with his friend Karl Friedrich, Prince of Hohenzollern, a saxophonist.

Marriage and children
Alexander married Princess Marie Luise "Lilly" of Sayn-Wittgenstein-Berleburg (born 1972), daughter of Otto Ludwig Prince of Sayn-Wittgenstein-Berleburg and his wife, Annette Baroness of Cramm, at Bückeburg on 27 August 1993; they had one son before divorcing in 2002:
 Hereditary Prince Ernst-August Alexander Wilhelm Bernhard Krafft Heinrich Donatus of Schaumburg-Lippe (born 13 May 1994).

Alexander married Nadja Anna Zsoeks (born 20 February 1975) civilly at Bückeburg on June 28, 2007 and religiously at Bückeburg two days later, June 30. They officially announced that they had separated on March 27, 2015. Nadja is an attorney in Munich. Before their divorce in June 2018, the couple had two daughters:
 Princess Friederike Marie-Christine Elisabeth Thaddaea Benita Eleonore Felipa of Schaumburg-Lippe (born 1 December 2008).
 Princess Philomena Sylvia Huberta Amelie Juliana Vera Marie-Anna of Schaumburg-Lippe (born 10 July 2011).
At the family seat Bückeburg Palace, Alexander married Iranian pianist Mahkameh Navabi on September 12, 2020.

Ancestry

References

External links
 Schloss Bückeburg 

1958 births
Living people
Nobility from Düsseldorf
House of Lippe
German royalty
Pretenders to the throne of Schaumburg-Lippe
Princes of Schaumburg-Lippe